Sackville—Preston—Chezzetcook (formerly known as Sackville—Eastern Shore and Sackville—Musquodoboit Valley—Eastern Shore) is a federal electoral district in Halifax, Nova Scotia, Canada, that has been represented in the House of Commons of Canada since 1997.

Demographics

From the 2006 census 

Ethnic groups:
European Canadian: 89.9%
African Canadian: 3.8%
First Nations: 2.2%
Chinese Canadian: 0.4%
Arab Canadian: 0.3%
Other: 0.8%

Languages:
English: 95.0%
French: 3.1%
German: 0.4%
Arabic: 0.3%
Other: 1.2%

Religions:
Protestant: 51.3%
Catholic: 36.8%
Other Christian: 1.2%
No religious affiliation: 10.2%

Education:
No certificate, diploma or degree: 22.7%
High school certificate: 23.9%
Apprenticeship or trade certificate or diploma: 13.0%
Community college, CEGEP or other non-university certificate or diploma: 21.7%
University certificate or diploma: 18.6%

Median Age:
38.4

Median total income:
$29,212

Average total income:
$34,589

Median household income:
$64,588

Average household income:
$72,245

Median family income:
$71,566

Average family income:
$78,873

Unemployment:
5.9%

Geography
The district includes the part of the Halifax Regional Municipality located on the Atlantic coast between Lake Charlotte and Jeddore Harbour in the east to Halifax Harbour in the west excluding the community of Dartmouth and the community  of Eastern Passage. It also includes HRM's northern suburbs in the Sackville River valley north to the boundary with Hants County.

History
The electoral district was created in 1996 from Central Nova and Dartmouth ridings, and was known as "Sackville—Musquodoboit Valley—Eastern Shore" from 1999 to 2003. MP Peter Stoffer has tabled a Private Members Bill to change the name of the riding to "Sackville—Preston—Eastern Shore". As per the 2012 federal electoral redistribution, this riding will be largely dissolved into the new riding of Sackville—Preston—Chezzetcook (94%), with small portions going to Central Nova (4%) and Dartmouth—Cole Harbour (2%).

Members of Parliament

This riding has elected the following Members of Parliament:

Election results

Sackville—Preston—Chezzetcook

2021 general election

2019 general election

2015 general election

Sackville—Eastern Shore

2011 general election

2008 general election

2006 general election

2004 general election

Sackville—Musquodoboit Valley—Eastern Shore

2000 general election

1997 general election

See also
 List of Canadian federal electoral districts
 Past Canadian electoral districts

References

Notes

External links
 Riding history for Sackville—Eastern Shore (1996–1999) from the Library of Parliament
 Riding history for Sackville—Musquodoboit Valley—Eastern Shore (1999–2003) from the Library of Parliament
 Riding history for Sackville—Eastern Shore (2003– ) from the Library of Parliament

Nova Scotia federal electoral districts
Politics of Halifax, Nova Scotia